James D. Harvey (7 August 1911 – after 1938) was an English professional footballer who played as a goalkeeper. He played in the Football League for Bristol Rovers and Gillingham.

Playing career
Harvey was born in York and began his senior football career with Sheffield Wednesday then moved to Rotherham United before dropping down to the Midland League with Frickley Colliery. He then moved to Bristol Rovers before a return to Frickley, where he was convicted of obtaining money by deception, before moving to Gillingham where he made 17 first team appearances.

References

External links
Official Frickley Athletic museum and hall of fame website

1911 births
Footballers from York
Year of death missing
English footballers
Association football goalkeepers
Sheffield Wednesday F.C. players
Wombwell F.C. players
Frickley Athletic F.C. players
Rotherham United F.C. players
Bristol Rovers F.C. players
Gillingham F.C. players
Denaby United F.C. players
English Football League players
Place of death missing